Grantville is an unincorporated community in Jefferson County, Kansas, United States.  As of the 2020 census, the population of the community and nearby areas was 182.  It is located east of Topeka on the south side of US-24 highway between Barton Rd and KOA/Wilson Rd.

History
Grantville was named in 1866 for Ulysses S. Grant, military commander in the Civil War and afterward 18th President of the United States.

The first post office in Grantville was established in October 1866.

Geography
Grantville is located in southwestern Jefferson County at  (39.083333, -95.561367), off U.S. Route 24. U.S. Route 24 runs along the northern edge of the community, leading east  to Perry and west  to the northern part of Topeka.

Climate
The climate in this area is characterized by hot, humid summers and generally mild to cool winters. According to the Köppen Climate Classification system, Grantville has a humid subtropical climate, abbreviated "Cfa" on climate maps.

Demographics

For statistical purposes, the United States Census Bureau has defined Grantville as a census-designated place (CDP).

Economy
Grantville has a fire station, a restaurant, a gas station and a few other local business. It also has a post office with the ZIP Code of 66429.

Education
Grantville is served by Perry-Lecompton Unified School District 343. The elementary school in Grantville closed in 2009, and children are now bused to schools in Perry and Lecompton.

Notable people
 Josh Billings, baseball player and manager

References

Further reading

External links
 Jefferson County maps: Current, Historic, KDOT

Census-designated places in Jefferson County, Kansas
Census-designated places in Kansas